Atoko Point is a 8,382 ft-cliff-elevation Point located in the eastern Grand Canyon, Coconino County of northern Arizona, United States. It is about 6.5 miles south-southeast of the northernmost point on the east of the North Rim (Point Imperial), but most of the points south, are on the East Rim (or South Rim) of the sub-plateau, the Walhalla Plateau. Atoko Point is 1.3 miles southeast of Roosevelt Point, and also 2.6 miles southeast of the Vista Encantada viewpoint. Two headwater canyons of Upper Kwagunt Creek and Canyon bisect around Atoko Point, and drain east to the south-flowing Colorado River, about 6.5 miles east, in the southernmost stretch of Marble Canyon. Atoko Point lies about one mile east of the Cape Royal Road.The cliff of Atoko Point is composed of Kaibab Limestone, upon Toroweap Formation, on white cliffs of Coconino Sandstone. Below is soft erodible, dk-burnt red Hermit Shale, on bright-red-orange Supai Group layers (4 units).

References

External links

 Aerial view: Atoko Point, Mountainzone.com
 

Cliffs of Arizona
Grand Canyon
Grand Canyon National Park
Grand Canyon, Walhalla Plateau
Colorado Plateau
Landforms of Coconino County, Arizona
Scenic viewpoints in Grand Canyon National Park